Maybank is a small unincorporated community in northern Forrest County, Mississippi.

History 
Maybank is located on the former Gulf and Ship Island Railroad. The community was named for an early citizen.

The Greenwood Sawmill Company formerly operated a lumber mill in Maybank.

References

Unincorporated communities in Mississippi
Unincorporated communities in Forrest County, Mississippi
Hattiesburg metropolitan area